Giuseppe Mori (24 January 1850 — 30 September 1934) was an Italian cardinal of the Roman Catholic Church. He served as secretary of the Sacred Congregation of the Council from 1916 until his death, and was elevated to the cardinalate in 1922.

Biography
Born in Loro Piceno, Mori studied at the seminary in Fermo and the Pontifical Roman Seminary. He was ordained to the priesthood on 17 September 1874, and then did pastoral work in Rome until 1880. Mori was raised to the rank of honorary chamberlain of his holiness on 4 October 1880, and served as a staff member (1885–1903) and the auditor (1903–1908) of the Sacred Congregation of the Council in the Roman Curia.

He later became undersecretary of the Sacred Congregation for the Discipline of the Sacraments on 20 October 1908, auditor of the Roman Rota on 9 February 1909, and secretary of the Sacred Congregation of the Council on 8 December 1916. As secretary of the council, Mori served as the second-highest official of that dicastery successively under Cardinals Francesco di Paola Cassetta, Donato Sbarretti, and Giulio Serafini.

Pope Pius XI created him Cardinal-Deacon of San Nicola in Carcere in the consistory of 11 December 1922. Mori chose to be elevated to a cardinal-priest (retaining the same titular church) after ten years' standing as a cardinal-deacon on 13 March 1933. He also served as a judge of the Apostolic Signatura and sat on the committee appointed to rule the Church during the sede vacante.

Mori died from heart disease in his native Loro Piceno, at age 84. He was buried in the chapel of the Loro Piceno cemetery, and his remains were later transferred to his family's tomb.

References

External links
Catholic-Hierarchy 
Cardinals of the Holy Roman Church

1850 births
1934 deaths
20th-century Italian cardinals
Pontifical Roman Seminary alumni
People from the Province of Macerata